Werewolf: The Beast Among Us is a 2012 action fantasy horror film directed by Louis Morneau. The film stars Ed Quinn, Stephen Rea, Guy Wilson and Steven Bauer.

Plot

In the 19th century, a young boy named Charles watches as a werewolf slaughters his family. Before dying, Charles' mother gives him a silver amulet of a howling wolf head, which belonged to his grandfather, who was a "Great Hunter" of werewolves. Charles escapes death by activating a trap which causes a chandelier to fall and kill the attacking werewolf. Twenty-five years later, Charles is a werewolf bounty hunter, working alongside a band of other hunters to rid the world of all werewolves. Werewolves in this fictional world can inflict lycanthropy. Infected individuals are typically shot in the head, after which their bodies are burned. Werewolves are usually only able to transform during the full moon. Charles and company receive an offer to hunt down a particularly vicious werewolf of a new breed. This new type of werewolf can transform three nights in a row.

Daniel, a young man apprenticed to the town doctor, has been studying the werewolf's victims to understand how it is behaving. When Charles and company arrive, Daniel witnesses Charles expose a scam run by a competing werewolf bounty hunter, Jaeger (German for "Hunter"), on the townsfolk. Impressed, Daniel offers his assistance to Charles, who politely declines his offer. Daniel persists until Charles gives in and agrees to let Daniel help him hunt down the werewolf. Eva, Daniel's rich girlfriend, tries to talk him out of hunting the werewolf and accepting an offer to study at the medical college in the city but fails. Stefan, a well-dressed and handsome companion of Charles, flirts with Eva, much to Daniel's annoyance.

During the next full moon, Jaeger and some friends try to poach the werewolf from Charles' group, but instead, they are tricked into triggering all of the traps that Charles and company had carefully prepared earlier. In doing so, the werewolf reveals that it is as intelligent as a person instead of the mindless animal that werewolves usually are. The local gypsy leader tells Charles and Daniel that this new werewolf will soon be able to transform at will. The townsfolk have lost faith in the bounty hunters and decide to take matters into their own hands. The town constable has established a list of people who have insufficient alibis to not be the werewolf, so some of the townsfolk lock them in jail. Daniel's mother, Vadoma, is locked away, as are Eva's father and the town constable, and placed under armed guard.

The next night, the constable has an epileptic seizure and is shot by the frightened guards, who mistakenly believe him to be in the throes of transformation. Now panicking, the guards shoot and kill all of the prisoners except for Vadoma and the local gypsy leader. Vadoma manages to escape from her cell. In the nearby ruins, Jaeger, who narrowly survived the previous night, is used as bait in a new trap by Charles. The werewolf battles Charles and his companions and wins but decides not to kill them, much to everyone's confusion. Daniel, who has become increasingly haunted by nightmares of a werewolf, wakes up the next morning with injuries matching those sustained by the werewolf the night before. Horrified to discover that he is the werewolf, Daniel confronts his mother, who tries to convince him to flee with her. Daniel refuses to leave and instead makes his way to town.

Charles suspects that Daniel might be the werewolf and asks the Doctor a few questions, confirming his suspicions. He then confronts Daniel, who begs Charles to kill him. Instead, the Doctor shoots Charles from behind, and confesses to training Daniel to hunt and kill people. Horrified, Daniel flees to Eva's house, where Stefan is assaulting her. Stefan and Daniel fight to a stalemate, despite Daniel's werewolf strength. Stefan ambushes Daniel and knocks him out when he leaves Eva's house. That night, Stefan puts Daniel on display for the townsfolk to see him transform. Daniel transforms, breaks free of his shackles, and flees. Vadoma, pleading with the townsfolk to spare her son, is killed by mistake.

Stefan and Daniel battle it out in front of Eva, and it is revealed that Stefan is a hundred-year-old wurdalak, granting him unnatural strength and toughness. Daniel impales Stefan on a spike, causing Stefan's body to disintegrate. The Doctor appears and orders Daniel, who is still in werewolf form, to kill Eva. Instead, Charles, since being shot, appears and shoots the Doctor from behind. Daniel turns back to normal, and Charles lets him go and gives him his silver amulet, telling Daniel that he is the hunter now. Eva and Daniel kiss passionately while Charles and crew walk away.

Cast
 Ed Quinn as Charles
 Ștefan Iancu as Young Charles
 Guy Wilson as Daniel
 Stephen Rea as Doc
 Rachel DiPillo as Eva
 Adam Croasdell as Stefan
 Ana Ularu as Kazia
 Florin Piersic Jr. as Fang
 Steven Bauer as Hyde
 Nia Peeples as Vadoma

Production
Werewolf: The Beast Among Us was filmed in Romania, with some scenes shot in Bethlen Castle.

Reception
The film has an aggregate score on Rotten Tomatoes of 40%, based on 5 reviews.

See also
Werewolf fiction

References

External links

2012 horror films
Films shot in Romania
American werewolf films
2012 films
Universal Pictures direct-to-video films
Universal Monsters
American vampire films
Films directed by Louis Morneau
Films scored by Michael Wandmacher
2010s English-language films
2010s American films